Dheena is a 2001 Indian Tamil-language action film written and directed by then-debutante A. R. Murugadoss, starring Ajith Kumar, Suresh Gopi, in his Tamil debut, and Laila. The music and background score is composed by Yuvan Shankar Raja and cinematography by K. Aravind. It was released on 14 January 2001.  The film was remade in Bengali as Deva (2002) and in Kannada as Dhumm (2002). The movie received positive reviews and became a commercial success at the box office.

Plot 
The film starts with the police arresting Aadhikesavan's men as suspects for burning Minister Malarvannan's liquor shop. Aadhi sends Dheenadhayalan aka Dheena, his adopted brother, to attack the false witnesses in this case and bail them out. This leads to further conflicts between Adhi, Dheena and Malarvannan and Dheena ends up chopping off Malarvannan's hand.

Meanwhile, Dheena falls in love with a girl named Chitra. After a little bit of pursuing and getting to know one another, they fall in love, and when Chitra learns that Dheena is involved in rowdyism, she stands by her decision to be with him because of Dheena's essential good character. Meanwhile, Dheena learns that Ashok has teased his sister Shanthi and thrashes him. A little later, he finds that Ashok has again given a love letter to Shanthi and beats him up, but learns that he is Chitra's brother. Chitra tells that Shanthi is also in love with Ashok. Dheena realises this misunderstanding and agrees to help them get married. Finding difficulties in obtaining Aadhi's permission, Shanthi elopes with Ashok and gets critically injured in an accident. In the hospital, Shanthi asks for Dheena's promise to protect Ashok's family from Aadhi before she succumbs to her injuries.

Aadhi, enraged by his sister's death, orders Dheena to kill the family of Ashok. But Dheena refuses and tells that Shanthi was also in love with him. Aadhi refuses to believe this and misunderstands the reason for Dheena's refusal to obey him is since he loves the boy's sister Chitra. Aadhi swears that he will kill everyone responsible for this including Dheena and the brothers become sworn enemies. Dheena moves to Chitra's flat to protect her family, but Ashok is intimidated and does not believe his intentions. Aadhi kills one of Ashok's friend and lands in jail. But Dheena continues to protect the family at various instances from Aadhi's men, and they all understand Dheena's good intentions.

Aadhi gets released and orders his men to kill Dheena and Chitra's family. The MLA Malarvannan finds about the brothers' enmity and tries to join hands with Aadhi to get his revenge on Dheena, but Aadhi refuses to get him involved. Malarvannan, however, is determined to get his revenge on Dheena and sends his henchmen under the guise that they all belong to Aadhi's group. Dheena finds out about this and fights them off, but Malarvannan's men stab Chitra. Meanwhile, Aadhi learns about Shanthi's love for Ashok from some of her friends and realises his mistake and joins forces with Dheena once again and fights off Malarvannan and his men. Knowing that Malarvannan was responsible for this, Aadhi tries to kill him, but Dheena stops him and tells that if he kills him, someone will avenge and this chain could continue and asks him to stop the violence. Chitra recovers from her injuries and finds that Aadhi has accepted their family. Aadhi finally declares Dheena to be his brother hereafter and they are all united.

Cast 

 Ajith Kumar as Dheenadhayalan (Dheena)
 Suresh Gopi as Aadikesavan
 Laila as Chitra
 Bala Singh as MLA Malarvannan
 Vaishnavi as Chitra's friend
 Sheela as Priya
 Rajesh as Police
 Sriman as Anand, Auto driver
 Mahanadi Shankar as Narayanan
 Shyam Ganesh as Ashok
 K. R. Vatsala as Malarvannan's wife
 Neelu as Restaurant Owner
 Crane Manohar as Bus Conductor
 Besant Ravi
 Vijayalakshmi as Chitra's mother
 Thadi Balaji as Balaji "Bala" , Auto Driver
 Raviraj as Advocate
 Sampath Ram as Aadikesavan's henchman
 Divya as Shanthi
 Pondy Ravi
 Nagma Special Appearance in Vathikuchi Pathikadhuda Song
 Alphonse Puthren as Molester Friend in Plaza Corner scenes

Production 
The film's director AR Murugadoss had previously worked as an assistant to S. J. Suryah. Murugadoss cast Ajith Kumar and signed up Ajith to play the lead roles with Malayalam actor Suresh Gopi roped in to play a parallel supporting role. The team considered signing Vasundhara Das as the lead actress, before opting for Laila. Nagma was selected to appear in an item number. In 2020, Laila revealed how she felt was not feeling well during the shooting of "Kadhal Website", but the upbeat tune of the song encouraged her to dance and the song became a hit upon release.

Soundtrack 
The soundtrack was composed by Yuvan Shankar Raja. Music was released on Tips Music

Release and reception 
The film released on 14 January 2001, during Pongal. It received a positive review from The Hindu, with the critic stating that the "acts of the hero does appeal or impress the audience because his bloody adventures in the film are justifiable" labelling the film as a mass masala entertainer. Rediff.com suggested that "overall, the film is briskly paced, and holds your interest throughout. What prompts the 'Can do better' report are the little, but eminently avoidable, niggles." but praised the performances of Ajith Kumar and Suresh Gopi. Visual Dasan of Kalki gave the film a verdict of "average".

Legacy 
The film's success indirectly marked the beginning of a new image of Ajith Kumar, that of an action hero that would appeal to the masses. Furthermore, Ajith Kumar's nickname in the film, Thala (Leader) became a new identity for the actor amongst his fans. The film also established Murugadoss who went on to become one of the successful directors whereas Yuvan Shankar's songs were equally successful which are considered to have played a major role for the film's great success.

Remakes 
The film was remade in Bengali as Deva (2002) and in Kannada as Dhumm (2002).

References

External links 
 

2000s masala films
2000s Tamil-language films
2001 action films
2001 directorial debut films
2001 films
Films directed by AR Murugadoss
Films scored by Yuvan Shankar Raja
Films set in Chennai
Films shot in Chennai
Indian action films
Indian films about revenge